Lionel Williamson (born 8 April 1944) is an Australian former rugby league footballer who played in the 1960s and 1970s. A talented , he played in the New South Wales Rugby Football League premiership with the Newtown club and also represented Queensland and Australia.

Born in Innisfail, Queensland, Williamson played a season with Halifax in 1964-65, also playing in the Queensland side from 1964 to 1967.

Gaining selection in Australia's 1968 World Cup squad, he scored two tries in the Final against France. He moved to Sydney to play with Newtown from 1969 and played 6 continuous seasons with the club. During this time he also played for Innisfail in North Queensland.

He played in the 1970 World Cup, again scoring in the final to help Australia to victory. Williamson continued representing Australia until 1974 which was also his final year playing for Newtown.

In 2008, the centenary year of rugby league in Australia, Williamson was named in the Newtown Jets 18-man team of the century.

Williamson is the brother of former Queensland and Newtown winger Henry Williamson, the grandfather of Sydney Roosters Lindsay Collins and the uncle of former Adelaide Rams, Canberra Raiders, Northern Eagles and Manly-Warringah Sea Eagles goal kicking utility player Luke Williamson.

References

1944 births
Living people
Australia national rugby league team players
Australian rugby league players
City New South Wales rugby league team players
Halifax R.L.F.C. players
New South Wales rugby league team players
Newtown Jets players
Queensland rugby league team players
Rugby league players from Innisfail, Queensland